The 1994 New Mexico Lobos football team was an American football team that represented the University of New Mexico in the Western Athletic Conference (WAC) during the 1994 NCAA Division I-A football season.  In their third season under head coach Dennis Franchione, the Lobos compiled a 5–7 record (4–4 against WAC opponents) and outscored opponents by a total of 401 to 386. 

The team's statistical leaders included Stoney Case with 3,117 passing yards, Eric Young with 732 rushing yards, Gavin Pearlman with 866 receiving yards, and kicker Nathan Vail with 75 points scored.

Schedule

Roster

References

New Mexico
New Mexico Lobos football seasons
New Mexico Lobos football